Frenzy (Italian: Frenesia) is a 1939 Italian comedy film directed by Mario Bonnard and starring Dina Galli, Antonio Gandusio and Betty Stockfeld.

It was shot at Cinecittà Studios in Rome. The film's sets were designed by the art director Gastone Medin.

Cast
 Dina Galli as Marta 
 Antonio Gandusio as Stefano 
 Betty Stockfeld as Maud 
 Vivi Gioi as Daniela 
 Titina De Filippo as Carolina 
 Osvaldo Valenti as Sigfrido 
 Paolo Stoppa as Bobby 
 Giulio Stival as Giacomo
 Ky Duyen as Sam Lee 
 Stefano Sibaldi as Il poeta 
 Fernando Simbolotti as Il maggiordomo

References

Bibliography
 Goble, Alan. The Complete Index to Literary Sources in Film. Walter de Gruyter, 1999.

External links

1939 films
1930s Italian-language films
Films directed by Mario Bonnard
1939 comedy films
Italian comedy films
Films shot at Cinecittà Studios
Italian black-and-white films
1930s Italian films